Cédric Énard (born 20 March 1976) is a French professional volleyball coach and former player. He is the current head coach of the Croatia national team and Berlin Recycling Volleys.

Honours

As a player
 National championships
 1998/1999  French Championship, with Stade Poitevin Poitiers

As a coach
 National championships
 2017/2018  French Championship, with Tours VB
 2018/2019  German Championship, with Berlin Recycling Volleys
 2019/2020  German SuperCup, with Berlin Recycling Volleys
 2019/2020  German Cup, with Berlin Recycling Volleys
 2020/2021  German SuperCup, with Berlin Recycling Volleys
 2020/2021  German Championship, with Berlin Recycling Volleys
 2021/2022  German SuperCup, with Berlin Recycling Volleys
 2021/2022  German Championship, with Berlin Recycling Volleys
 2022/2023  German SuperCup, with Berlin Recycling Volleys
 2022/2023  German Cup, with Berlin Recycling Volleys

References

External links

 
 
 Coach/Player profile at Volleybox.net

1976 births
Living people
Sportspeople from Vienne
French men's volleyball players
French volleyball coaches
Volleyball coaches of international teams
French expatriate sportspeople in Germany
French expatriate sportspeople in Estonia
French expatriate sportspeople in Croatia